Rhinestones & Steel Strings is a blues album by the American guitarist and singer Rory Block, released in 1984 by Rounder Records.

Track listing
 "Future Blues" (Brown) 3:07
 "I Might Find a Way" (Block) 2:57
 "El Vuelo del Alma (For Edgar)" (Block) 3:25
 "Lovin' Fool" (Block) 3:31
 "The Golden Vanity" (traditional) 4:46
 "Dr. Make It Right" (Block) 3:03
 "No Way for Me to Get Along" (Wilkins) 3:23
 "Back to the Woods" (Spands) 2:22
 "God's Gift to Women" (Block) 2:37
 "Sit Down on the Banks" (Davis) 3:23

References

Rory Block albums
1984 albums
Rounder Records albums